The 2015–16 season is Beitar Jerusalem's 47th season in the Israeli Premier League.
The club's owner Eli Tabib in June said he would sell the team to someone that will invest money in the club.
However, he later changed his mind and decided to continue investing in the squad and not abandon the team.
Beitar then signed eight players in pre-season: Liroy Zhairi , Nes Zamir , Dovev Gabay , Uri Magbo , Daniel Askling , Vlad Morar , Nisso Kapiloto , Pablo de Lucas and Jesus Rueda.

First team

On loan

Transfers

Summer

In:

Out:

Pre-season and friendlies

Competitions

Ligat Ha'Al

Results

League table

Top playoff

Top playoff table

State Cup

Toto Cup

UEFA Europa League

Qualifying phase

Squad statistics

Appearances and goals

|-
|colspan="14"|Players away from Beitar Jerusalem on loan:
|-
|colspan="14"|Players who appeared for Beitar Jerusalem that left during the season:

|}

Goal scorers

Disciplinary record

References

External links
 Beitar Jerusalem website

Beitar Jerusalem F.C. seasons
Beitar Jerusalem